Lee Tung-hao (born 7 October 1955) is a Taiwanese economist and politician also known by the name Thomas Lee. He has served as a member of the Legislative Yuan twice, from 2002 to 2005, and again between 2012 and 2016.

Academic career
Lee graduated from National Taiwan University with a bachelor's degree in economics and later earned a doctorate in the subject from Ohio State University in the United States. Outside of politics, Lee has taught finance at National Chengchi University.

Political career
Lee was elected to the Legislative Yuan in 2001 via the People First Party proportional representation party list. In 2004, he was named a defendant in two court cases, as Chen Che-nan and Chang Ching-fang separately charged Lee with libel. Later that year, Lee offered to resign his legislative seat, as PFP chairman James Soong attempted to join the body and engage President Chen Shui-bian in debate. After Lee's first term expired, he was nominated by the People First Party to join the National Communications Commission. In 2011, Lee was again placed on the party list ballot as a PFP legislative candidate. During his second legislative term, Lee served as caucus whip for the People First Party. In November 2012, he attended a student-led protest against the monopolization of media in Taiwan. Lee opposed the 2013 passage of the Senior Secondary Education Act and Junior College Act because he believed that the laws did not allocate enough money to the education system. After the 2014 Kaohsiung gas explosions, Lee proposed special statues that would help relief efforts. In 2015, Chen Yi-chieh, Kao Chin Su-mei, Hsu Hsin-ying, and Lee founded a new legislative caucus named the New Alliance.

Political stances
Lee supported the signing of the Economic Cooperation Framework Agreement between China and Taiwan.

He has stated that ractopamine use in beef "is not an urgent issue." After the Codex Alimentarius Commission voted to permit trace amounts of ractopamine in beef, Lee suggested that the government adopt the international standard and propose legislative amendments to allow the United States to export beef to Taiwan.

Lee became known as "the cannon of tax reform" in part due to his support of the capital gains tax.

References

1955 births
Living people
Politicians of the Republic of China on Taiwan from New Taipei
People First Party Members of the Legislative Yuan
Party List Members of the Legislative Yuan
Members of the 5th Legislative Yuan
Members of the 8th Legislative Yuan
20th-century Taiwanese economists
Academic staff of the National Chengchi University
National Taiwan University alumni
Ohio State University Graduate School alumni